Mohabbat Ho Gayi Hai Tumse is a 2002 Hindi romance film directed by Rishi Talwar and produced by Satish Khanna. The film features Sanjay Dutt, Chandrachur Singh and Shamita Shetty as main characters. Despite being completed in 2001, the film remains unreleased.

Cast
Sanjay Dutt as Aryan
Chandrachur Singh as Raj
Shamita Shetty as Megha
Payal Rohatgi as Natasha
Anupama Verma
Tinu Anand
Anju Mahendru
Alok Nath
Puru Raaj Kumar
Dinesh Lamba
Vrajesh Hirjee
Rajiv Verma
Rekha Rao
Vishwajeet Pradhan

Music

The music of the film was composed by Sanjeev-Darshan and the lyrics were written by  Sameer.

References

2000s Hindi-language films
Films scored by Sanjeev Darshan
Unreleased Hindi-language films